In six-dimensional geometry, a runcinated 6-orthplex is a convex uniform 6-polytope with 3rd order truncations (runcination) of the regular 6-orthoplex.

There are 12 unique runcinations of the 6-orthoplex with permutations of truncations, and cantellations. Half are expressed relative to the dual 6-cube.

Runcinated 6-orthoplex

Alternate names
 Small prismatohexacontatetrapeton (spog) (Jonathan Bowers)

Images

Runcicantellated 6-orthoplex

Alternate names
 Prismatorhombated hexacontatetrapeton (prog) (Jonathan Bowers)

Images

Runcitruncated 6-orthoplex

Alternate names
 Prismatotruncated hexacontatetrapeton (potag) (Jonathan Bowers)

Images

Biruncicantellated 6-cube

Alternate names
 Great biprismated hexeractihexacontatetrapeton (gobpoxog) (Jonathan Bowers)

Images

Related polytopes

These polytopes are from a set of 63 uniform 6-polytopes generated from the B6 Coxeter plane, including the regular 6-cube or 6-orthoplex.

Notes

References
 H.S.M. Coxeter: 
 H.S.M. Coxeter, Regular Polytopes, 3rd Edition, Dover New York, 1973 
 Kaleidoscopes: Selected Writings of H.S.M. Coxeter, edited by F. Arthur Sherk, Peter McMullen, Anthony C. Thompson, Asia Ivic Weiss, Wiley-Interscience Publication, 1995,  
 (Paper 22) H.S.M. Coxeter, Regular and Semi Regular Polytopes I, [Math. Zeit. 46 (1940) 380-407, MR 2,10]
 (Paper 23) H.S.M. Coxeter, Regular and Semi-Regular Polytopes II, [Math. Zeit. 188 (1985) 559-591]
 (Paper 24) H.S.M. Coxeter, Regular and Semi-Regular Polytopes III, [Math. Zeit. 200 (1988) 3-45]
 Norman Johnson Uniform Polytopes, Manuscript (1991)
 N.W. Johnson: The Theory of Uniform Polytopes and Honeycombs, Ph.D. 
  x3o3o3x3o4o - spog, x3o3x3x3o4o - prog, x3x3o3x3o4o - potag, o3x3x3x3x4o - gobpoxog

External links 
 
 Polytopes of Various Dimensions
 Multi-dimensional Glossary

6-polytopes